Bibliography of dark fantasy, horror, science fiction and nonfiction writer Darrell Schweitzer:

Fiction

Sir Julian

 "The Hag" (from Swords Against Darkness III, Mar. 1978 - collected in We Are All Legends (1981))
 "The Lady of the Fountain" (from Void no. 5, Feb. 1977 - collected in We Are All Legends (1981))
 "Island of Faces" (1981 - collected in We Are All Legends (1981))
 "The Veiled Pool of Mistorak" (from Fantasy Crosswinds no. 2, Jan. 1977 - collected in We Are All Legends (1981))
 "The One Who Spoke with the Owls" (from Void no. 4, May 1976 - collected in We Are All Legends (1981))
 "The Castle of Kites and Crows" (from Swords Against Darkness V, Nov. 1979 - collected in We Are All Legends (1981))
 "The Riddle of the Horn" (from Heroic Fantasy, Apr. 1979 - collected in We Are All Legends (1981))
 "Divers Hands" (from The Year's Best Horror Stories: Series VII, Jul. 1979 - collected in We Are All Legends (1981))
 "The Unknown God Cried Out" (1981 - collected in We Are All Legends (1981))
 "Into the Dark Land" (from Alien Worlds, 1979 - collected in We Are All Legends (1981))
 "A Fabulous, Formless Darkness" (from Ron Graham Presents Others Worlds, 1978 - collected in We Are All Legends (1981)) 
 "Midnight, Moonlight, and the Secret of the Sea" (1981 - collected in We Are All Legends (1981))
 "L'envoi" (1981 - collected in We Are All Legends (1981))
 We Are All Legends (1981 short story collection)

Tom O'Bedlam

 "Tom O'Bedlam's Night Out" (from Fantastic v. 26, no. 3, September 1977 - collected in Tom O'Bedlam's Night Out (1985))
 "Raving Lunacy" (from Amazing Stories v. 55, no. 2, July 1981 - collected in Tom O'Bedlam's Night Out (1985))
 "Continued Lunacy" (from Amazing Science Fiction v. 56, no. 5, March 1983 - collected in Tom O'Bedlam's Night Out (1985))
 "The Last Dangerous Lunacy" (from Amazing Stories v. 63, no. 3, Sep. 1988 - collected in Refugees from an Imaginary Country (1999))
 "Time Enough for Lunacy" (from Weirdbook no. 25, Aut. 1990 - collected in Nightscapes (2000)
 "Tom O'Bedlam and the King of Dreams" (from Weird Tales v. 56, no. 1, Fall 1999 - collected in The Great World and the Small (2001))
 "Tom O'Bedlam and the Mystery of Love" (from The Enchanter Completed: A Tribute Anthology for L. Sprague de Camp, May 2005 - collected in The Emperor of the Ancient Word (2013))

Etelven Thios

 "The Murder of Etelven Thios" (from Weirdbook no. 14, Jun. 1979 - collected in The Great World and the Small (2001))
 "The Other Murder of Etelven Thios" (from Weirdbook no. 15, 1981 - collected in The Great World and the Small (2001))
 "The Final? Murder? of Etelven Thios?" (from Weirdbook no. 15, 1981 - collected in The Great World and the Small (2001))

The Goddess

 "The Stones Would Weep" (from Fantasy Tales v. 6, no. 12, Win. 1983 - collected in Echoes of the Goddess
 "The Story of a Dadar" (from Amazing Science Fiction Stories v. 56, no. 1, Jun. 1982 - collected in Tom O'Bedlam's Night Out (1985), Echoes of the Goddess (2013) and The Darrell Schweitzer Megapack (2013))
 "The Diminishing Man" (from Fantasy Book, v. 3, no. 3-4, Sep.-Dec. 1984 - collected in Echoes of the Goddess (2013))
 "A Lantern Maker of Ai Hanlo" (from Amazing Stories v. 58, no. 2, Jul. 1984 - collected in Tom O'Bedlam's Night Out (1985), Echoes of the Goddess (2013) and The Darrell Schweitzer Megapack (2013))
 "Holy Fire" (from Weirdbook 17, 1983 - collected in Echoes of the Goddess (2013))
 "The Stolen Heart" (from Weirdbook 26, Aut. 1991 - collected in Echoes of the Goddess (2013))
 "Immortal Bells" (from Weirdbook 18, 1983 - collected in Echoes of the Goddess (2013))
 "Between Night and Morning" (from Weirdbook 20, Spr. 1985 - collected in Echoes of the Goddess (2013))
 "The Shaper of Animals" (from Amazing Stories v. 62, no. 2, Jul. 1987 - collected in Echoes of the Goddess (2013))
 "Three Brothers" (from Weirdbook 23/24, 1988 - collected in Echoes of the Goddess (2013))
 "Coming of Age in the City of the Goddess" (from Fantasy Book v. 4, no. 2, Jun. 1985 - collected in Echoes of the Goddess (2013))
 The Shattered Goddess (1983 novel)
 Echoes of the Goddess (2013 short story collection)

Sherlock Holmes

 "The Adventure of the Hanoverian Vampires" (1990 - collected in Deadly Things (2011))
 "The Adventure of the Death-Fetch" (1994 - collected in  - collected in The Great World and the Small (2001) and Deadly Things (2011))
 "Sherlock Holmes, Dragon-Slayer" (1996 - collected in Deadly Things (2011))

The Great River

 "To Become a Sorcerer" (1991 - expanded as The Mask of the Sorcerer (1995))
 The Mask of the Sorcerer (1995 novel)
 "On the Last Night of the Festival of the Dead" (from Interzone no. 90, Dec. 1994 - collected in Refugees from an Imaginary Country (1999), Sekenre (2004) and The Darrell Schweitzer Megapack (2013))
 "The Sorcerer's Gift" (from Worlds of Fantasy & Horror, Win. 1996-7 - collected in Sekenre (2004))
 "King Father Stone" (from Interzone no. 103, Jan. 1996 - collected in Sekenre (2004))
 "The Giant Vorviades" (from Interzone no. 99, Sep. 1995 - collected in Sekenre (2004))
 "The Silence of Kings" (from Weirdbook no. 30, Spr. 1997 - collected in Sekenre (2004))
 "Vandibar Nasha in the College of Shadows" (from Adventures of Sword and Sorcery no. 7, Sep. 2000 - collected in Sekenre (2004) and The Darrell Schweitzer Megapack (2013))
 "In the Street of the Witches" (from Weird Tales v. 56, no. 4, Sum. 2000 - collected in Sekenre (2004))
 "The Lantern of the Supreme Moment" (from Space and Time no. 93, Spr. 2001 - collected in Sekenre (2004))
 "From Out of the Crocodile's Mouth" (from Weird Tales v. 58, no. 1, Fall 2001 - collected in Sekenre (2004))
 "Dreams of the Stone King's Daughter" (from Weird Tales v. 59, no. 2, Win. 2002 - collected in Sekenre (2004))
 "Seeking the Gifts of the Queen of Vengeance" (from Odyssey, iss. 2, 1998 - collected in Sekenre (2004))
 "Lord Abernaeven's Tale" (from Weird Tales v. 60, no. 2, Jan.-Feb. 2004 - collected in Sekenre (2004))
 Sekenre: The Book of the Sorcerer (2004 short story collection)
 "O King of Pain and Splendor!" (from Postscripts no. 20/21, Dec. 2009)
 "The Reprieve" (unpublished)

Corpsenburg

 "The Most Beautiful Dead Woman in the World" (from Interzone no. 189, May/Jun. 2003 - collected in Living With the Dead (2008) and The Darrell Schweitzer Megapack (2013))
 "They Are Still Dancing" (from Interzone no. 192, Nov./Dec. 2003 - collected in Living With the Dead (2008))
 "The Order of Things Must Be Preserved" (from Interzone no. 193, Spr. 2004 - collected in Living With the Dead (2008))
 "The Boy Who Dreamed of Nothing At All" (2008 - collected in Living With the Dead (2008))
 "The Observatory Committee" (2008 - collected in Living With the Dead (2008))
 Living With the Dead (The Tale of Old Corpsenberg) (2008 short story collection)

Pliny the Younger

 "Some Unpublished Correspondence of the Younger Pliny" (from The Mammoth Book of Roman Whodunnits, 2003 - collected in Deadly Things (2011))
 "The Stolen Venus" (from Alfred Hitchcock's Mystery Magazine, Oct. 2008 - collected in Deadly Things (2011))

Emperor of the Ancient Word

 "The Messenger" (from Weird Tales v. 62, no. 5, November/December 2007 - collected in The Emperor of the Ancient Word (2013) and The Darrell Schweitzer Megapack (2013))
 "The Emperor of the Ancient Word" (from Space and Time no. 99, Spring 2005 - collected in The Emperor of the Ancient Word (2013))

Other novels

 The White Isle (1989)
 The Dragon House (2018)

Other short story collections

 Tom O'Bedlam's Night Out and Other Strange Excursions (1985)
 The Meaning of Life and Other Awesome Cosmic Revelations (1988)
 Transients and Other Disquieting Stories (1993)
 Refugees from an Imaginary Country (1999)
 Necromancies and Netherworlds: Uncanny Stories (1999) with Jason Van Hollander
 Nightscapes: Tales of the Ominous and Magical (2000)
 The Great World and the Small: More Tales of the Ominous and Magical (2001)
 Deadly Things: A Collection of Mysterious Tales (2011)
 The Emperor of the Ancient Word and Other Fantastic Stories (2013)
 The Darrell Schweitzer Megapack (2013)
 Awaiting Strange Gods: Weird and Lovecraftian Fictions (2015)
 The Mysteries of the Faceless King: The Best Short Fiction of Darrell Schweitzer Volume I (2020)
 The Last Heretic: The Best Short Fiction of Darrell Schweitzer Volume II (2020)

Other short stories

 "Memories, Just Memories" (1970)
 "The Silent Screamers" (1971)
 "Come to Mother" (1971)
 "Wrecking Crew" (1972)
 "Legends" (1972)
 "In the Evening of Dreams" (1973 - collected in Nightscapes (2000))
 "Encounter" (1973)
 "The Story of Obbok" (1973 - collected in Tom O'Bedlam's Night Out (1985))
 "The Kingdom of the Air" (1974)
 "A Special Purpose" (1974)
 "How Ranthes Yin Sailed a Boat on the Waters of the River Time" (1975)
 "The White Isle" (1975 - expanded as The White Isle (1989))
 "The Cabin" (1976)
 "The Lady of the Darkwood" (1977)
 "Something Like the Hobo Bird" (1977)
 "The Story of the Brown Man" (1977 - collected in Tom O'Bedlam's Night Out (1985))
 "The Last Horror Out of Arkham" (1977)
 "A Vision of Rembathene" (1977 - collected in Tom O'Bedlam's Night Out (1985))
 "How Four Brought Silence to the City of Storytellers" (1977)
 "The Soul of the Poet" (1977)
 "Wanderers and Travellers We Were" (1978 - collected in The Great World and the Small (2001))
 "The Teddybear" (1978)
 "The Wings of the White Bird" (1978 - collected in Tom O'Bedlam's Night Out (1985))
 "Boy Meets Girl" (1978)
 "Caliban's Revenge" (1978 - collected in Nightscapes (2000))
 "The Giant's Frosted Daughter" (1979)
 "The Secret" (with Henry L. Lazarus) (1979)
 "Never Argue With Antique Dealers" (1980)
 "Relatively Speaking" (with Lee Weinstein) (1980)
 "The Story of the Little Brown Man" (1980)
 "The Headless Horseman" (1980) 
 "The Faces of Midnight" (1981)
 "The Doctor's Tale" (1981)
 "The Game of Sand and Fire" (1981 - collected in Tom O'Bedlam's Night Out (1985))
 "A Night in a Haunted Wood" (1981)
 "The Pretenses of Hinyar" (1981 - collected in Tom O'Bedlam's Night Out (1985))
 "The Forest Dream" (1982)
 "Flesh and Shadow" (1983)
 "Sunrise" (1983 - collected in Tom O'Bedlam's Night Out (1985))
 "The Fisherman" (1983)
 "The Phantom Knight" (1983)
 "That Dead Men Rise Up Never" (1984)
 "Jungle Eyes" (1985 - collected in Tom O'Bedlam's Night Out (1985))
 "The Last of the Shadow Titans" (1985 - collected in Tom O'Bedlam's Night Out (1985))
 "The Wrong Stop" (A Story for Children)" (1985)
 "The Last Child of Masferigon" (with John Gregory Betancourt) (1985 - collected in Tom O'Bedlam's Night Out (1985))
 "The Stranger from Baal-Ad-Theon" (1985 - collected in Tom O'Bedlam's Night Out (1985))
 "The Bermuda Triangle Explained" (1985 - collected in Tom O'Bedlam's Night Out (1985))
 "The Adventure in the House of Phaon" (1985 - collected in Tom O'Bedlam's Night Out (1985))
 "Leaving" (1986 - collected in Transients (1993))
 "Jason, Come Home" (1986 - collected in Transients (1993))
 "The Voice of Bel-Hemad" (1986 - collected in Nightscapes (2000))
 "Pennies from Hell" (1987 - collected in Transients (1993))
 "The Children of Lommos" (with John Gregory Betancourt) (1987 - collected in Transients (1993))
 "Transients" (1987 - collected in Transients (1993) and The Darrell Schweitzer Megapack (2013))
 "The Chivalry of Sir Aldingar" (1987)
 "The Mysteries of the Faceless King" (1988 - collected in Refugees from an Imaginary Country (1999) and The Darrell Schweitzer Megapack (2013)) 
 "We Are the Dead" (1988 - collected in The Great World and the Small (2001))
 "The Young Man Who Did Not Know His Father" (1988)
 "The Meaning of Life" (1988 - collected in The Meaning of Life and Other Awesome Cosmic Revelations (1988))
 "A Public Nuisance" (1988 - collected in The Meaning of Life and Other Awesome Cosmic Revelations (1988))
 "The Man Who Was Galumphed Against His Will" (1988 - collected in The Meaning of Life and Other Awesome Cosmic Revelations (1988))
 "The Man Who Wasn't Nice to Pumpkin Head Dolls" (1988 - collected in Transients (1993))
 "Malevendra's Pool" (1989 - collected in Refugees from an Imaginary Country (1999))
 "Clocks" (1989 - collected in Transients (1993))
 "King Yvorian's Wager" (1989 - collected in Refugees from an Imaginary Country (1999) and The Darrell Schweitzer Megapack (2013))
 "Seeing Them" (1989 - collected in Transients (1993))
 "The Man Who Found the Heart of the Forest" (1989 - collected in Transients (1993))
 "Going to the Mountain" (1990 - collected in Refugees from an Imaginary Country (1999))
 "The Unmaker of Men" (with Jason Van Hollander) (1990 - collected in Necromancies and Netherworlds (1999))
 "Soft" (1990 - collected in Transients (1993))
 "Peeling It Off" (1990 - collected in Transients (1993) and The Darrell Schweitzer Megapack (2013))
 "The Strange Rider from the Far, Dark Land" (1990 - collected in Refugees from an Imaginary Country (1999))
 "The Throwing Suit" (with Jason Van Hollander) (1990 - collected in  Transients (1993) and Necromancies and Netherworlds (1999))
 "Angry Man" (1990 - collected in Refugees from an Imaginary Country (1999))
 "The Paloverde Lodge" (with Jason Van Hollander) (1990 - collected in Transients (1993) and Necromancies and Netherworlds (1999))
 "Men Without Maps" (with Jason Van Hollander) (1991 - collected in Necromancies and Netherworlds (1999))
 "The Cloth Gods of Zhamiir" (with Jason Van Hollander) (1991 - collected in Necromancies and Netherworlds (1999))
 "Minotauress" (1991 - collected in Refugees from an Imaginary Country (1999))
 "Short and Nasty" (1991 - collected in Transients (1993))
 "Savages" (1991 - collected in Refugees from an Imaginary Country (1999) and The Darrell Schweitzer Megapack (2013))
 "The Spirit of the Back Stairs" (1991 - collected in Transients (1993) and The Darrell Schweitzer Megapack (2013))
 "The Caravan of the Dead" (with Jason Van Hollander) (1992 - collected in Necromancies and Netherworlds (1999))
 "Told by Moonlight" (1992 - collected in Nightscapes (2000))
 "The Outside Man" (1992 - collected in Refugees from an Imaginary Country (1999) and The Darrell Schweitzer Megapack (2013))
 "The Great World and the Small" (1993 - collected in The Great World and the Small (2001))
 "The Liar's Mouth" (1993 - collected in Nightscapes (2000))
 "An Interview with Edgar Allan Poe" (1993 - collected in Windows of the Imagination: Essays on Fantastic Literature (1998))
 "Three Brothers of the Air" (1993)
 "The Cup of Pain" (1993)
 "The Sorcerer Evoragdou" (1993 - collected in Refugees from an Imaginary Country (1999) and The Darrell Schweitzer Megapack (2013))
 "The Man in the White Mask" (with Jason Van Hollander) (1994 - collected in Necromancies and Netherworlds (1999))
 "On the Holy Mountain" (1994 - collected in Nightscapes (2000))
 "Those of the Air" (with Jason Van Hollander) (1994 - collected in Necromancies and Netherworlds (1999) and Awaiting Strange Gods (2015))
 "One of the Secret Masters" (1994 - collected in Refugees from an Imaginary Country (1999) and The Darrell Schweitzer Megapack (2013))
 "The Epilogue of the Sword" (1995 - collected in Nightscapes (2000))
 "The Witch of the World's End" (1995 - collected in Nightscapes (2000) and The Darrell Schweitzer Megapack (2013))
 "The Knight of Pale Countenance" (1995 - collected in Refugees from an Imaginary Country (1999))
 "Runaway" (1995 - collected in Refugees from an Imaginary Country (1999))
 "Climbing" (1995 - collected in Refugees from an Imaginary Country (1999))
 "The Magical Dilemma of Mondesir" (with Jason Van Hollander) (1995 - collected in Necromancies and Netherworlds (1999))
 "Silkie Son" (1995 - collected in The Great World and the Small (2001))
 "Believing in the Twentieth Century" (1996 - collected in The Great World and the Small (2001))
 "The Unwanted Grail" (1996 - collected in The Great World and the Small (2001))
 "Last Things" (1996 - collected in Refugees from an Imaginary Country (1999) and Deadly Things (2011))
 "The Silence in Kandretiphon" (1996 - collected in Nightscapes (2000))
 "Adam" (1996 - collected in Nightscapes (2000))
 "Smart Guy" (1996 - collected in Nightscapes (2000))
 "The Crystal-Man" (with Jason Van Hollander) (1996 - collected in Necromancies and Netherworlds (1999))
 "The Dragon of Camlann" (1997 - collected in The Great World and the Small (2001))
 "Kvetchula" (1997 - collected in Nightscapes (2000) and The Darrell Schweitzer Megapack (2013))
 "I Told You So" (1997 - collected in The Great World and the Small (2001))
 "Sir Artegall in The Dragon of Camlann" (1997)
 "The Death of Falstaff" (1997 - collected in Refugees from an Imaginary Country (1999) and Deadly Things (2011))
 "Refugees from an Imaginary Country" (1997 - collected in Refugees from an Imaginary Country (1999) and The Darrell Schweitzer Megapack (2013))
 "Running to Camelot" (1998 - collected in Nightscapes (2000) and The Darrell Schweitzer Megapack (2013))
 "Murdered by Love" (1998 - collected in Deadly Things (2011))
 "Return from Exile" (1998 - collected in Nightscapes (2000))
 "A Servant of Satan" (1998 - collected in Nightscapes (2000))
 "Just Suppose" (1998 - collected in The Great World and the Small (2001))
 "Ye Olde Englishe Ghost Story" (1999)
 "Ghost" (1999 - collected in The Great World and the Small (2001))
 "Bitter Chivalry" (1999 - collected in Nightscapes (2000))
 "Saxon Midnight" (2000 - collected in The Emperor of the Ancient Word (2013))
 "The Invisible Knight's Squire" (2000 - collected in The Great World and the Small (2001))
 "The Fire Eggs" (2000 - collected in The Emperor of the Ancient Word (2013))
 "Appeasing the Darkness" (2000)
 "The Last of the Black Wine" (2001)
 "They Never Found His Head" (2001)
 "Our Father Down Below" (2001 - collected in The Emperor of the Ancient Word (2013))
 "The Last of the Giants of Albion" (2002 - collected in The Emperor of the Ancient Word (2013))
 "Whom Even Death Might Fear" (2002)
 "Secret Murders" (2002 - collected in The Emperor of the Ancient Word (2013))
 "The Girl Who Fell from the Moon: A Legend of Atlantis" (2002)
 "A Dark Miracle" (2002)
 "Why We Do It" (2002 - collected in Awaiting Strange Gods (2015))
 "Envy, the Gardens of Ynath, and the Sin of Cain" (2002 - collected in Awaiting Strange Gods (2015))
 "How It Ended" (2002 - collected in The Emperor of the Ancient Word (2013) and The Darrell Schweitzer Megapack (2013))
 "The Dead Kid" (2002 - collected in The Emperor of the Ancient Word (2013))
 "The Third Way" (2002)
 "The Runners in the Maze" (2003)
 "The Scroll of the Worm" (with Jason Van Hollander) (2004 - collected in Awaiting Strange Gods (2015))
 "The Rider of the Dark" (2004)
 "At the Top of the Black Stairs" (2005 - collected in The Emperor of the Ancient Word (2013))
 "Fighting the Zeppelin Gang" (2006 - collected in The Emperor of the Ancient Word (2013) and The Darrell Schweitzer Megapack (2013))
 "The Hero Spoke" (2006 - collected in The Emperor of the Ancient Word (2013))
 "Sometimes You Have to Shout About It" (2007 - collected in Awaiting Strange Gods (2015))
 "A Lost City of the Jungle" (2007 - collected in The Emperor of the Ancient Word (2013))
 "Honored Be Her Name" (with John Gregory Betancourt) (2007)
 "In a Byzantine Garden" (2007 - collected in Deadly Things (2011))
 "Sweep Me to My Revenge!" (2007 - collected in The Emperor of the Ancient Word (2013))
 "The Idol in His Hand" (2007)
 "Thousand Year Warrior" (2008 - collected in The Emperor of the Ancient Word (2013))
 "The Eater of Hours" (2009 - collected in The Darrell Schweitzer Megapack (2013) and Awaiting Strange Gods (2015))
 "In the Dreaming House" (2010)
 "Kvetchula's Daughter" (2010 - collected in The Darrell Schweitzer Megapack (2013))
 "Ghost Dancing" (2010 - collected in Awaiting Strange Gods (2015))
 "Howling in the Dark" (2010 - collected in The Darrell Schweitzer Megapack (2013) and Awaiting Strange Gods (2015))
 "The Werewolf of Camelot" (2010)
 "Pages from an Invisible Book" (2010)
 "We Are the Monsters Now" (2011 - collected in The Emperor of the Ancient Word (2013))
 "Into the Gathering Dark" (2011)
 "The Last Heretic" (2011 - collected in The Darrell Schweitzer Megapack (2013))
 "Class Reunion" (2011 - collected in Awaiting Strange Gods (2015))
 "Innsmouth Idyll" (2011 - collected in Awaiting Strange Gods (2015))
 "The Runners Beyond the Wall" (2012 - collected in Awaiting Strange Gods (2015))
 "True Blue" (2012)
 "The Clockwork King, the Queen of Glass, and the Man with the Hundred Knives" (2012 - collected in Awaiting Strange Gods (2015))
 "Jimmy Bunny" (2012 - collected in Awaiting Strange Gods (2015))
 "Dreaming Kandresphar" (2013)
 "No Signal" (2013)
 "In Old Commoriom" (2013 - collected in Awaiting Strange Gods (2015))
 "Going to Ground" (2014)
 "Odd Man Out" (2014)
 "Stragglers from Carrhae" (2014 - collected in Awaiting Strange Gods (2015))
 "The Warm" (2014 - collected in Awaiting Strange Gods (2015))
 "Hanged Man and Ghost" (2014 - collected in Awaiting Strange Gods (2015))
 "An American Story" (2014)
 "On the Eastbound Train" (2014 - collected in Awaiting Strange Gods (2015))
 "Come, Follow Me" (2015)
 "Spiderwebs in the Dark" (2015 - collected in Awaiting Strange Gods (2015))
 "The House of the Witches" (2015)
 "Boxes of Dead Children" (2015)
 "The Head Shop in Arkham" (? - collected in Awaiting Strange Gods (2015))
 "The Corpse Detective" (? - collected in Awaiting Strange Gods (2015))
 "The Last of the Black Wind" (? - collected in Awaiting Strange Gods (2015))
 "Old One's Fall" (2015)
 "Madness on the Black Planet" (2016)
 "The Red Witch of Chorazin" (2016)
 "The Dragons of the Night" (2016)
 "The Hutchison Boy" (2016)
 "The Tale and the Teller" (2017)
 "Not in the Card Catalog" (2017)
 "A Predicament" (2017)
 "The Tale and the Teller" (2017)
 "The Girl in the Attic" (2017)
 "The Philosopher Thief" (2018)
 "Uncle's in the Treetops" (2018)
 "The Song of Black Mountain" (2019)
 "Down to a Sunless Sea" (2019) 
 "All Kings and Princes Bow Down Unto Me" (2021)
 "The Reprieve" (2021)

Poetry
 Non Compost Mentis: An Affrontery of Limericks and Other Eldritch Metrical Terrors (1995)
 Poetica Dementia: Being a Further Accumulation of Metrical Offenses (1997)
 "Stop Me Before I Do It Again!" (1999)
 They Never Found the Head: Poems of Sentiment & Reflection (2001)
 The Innsmouth Tabernacle Choir Hymnal (2004)
 Groping Towards the Light (2005)
 The Arkham Alphabet Book for Children (2006)
 Ghosts of Past and Future (2008)
 The Second Innsmouth Tabernacle choir Hymnal (2019)
 The Pratfall of Cthulhu and Other Literary Mishaps (2019)

Nonfiction
 Lovecraft in the Cinema (1975)
 The Dream Quest of H. P. Lovecraft (1978)
 Conan's World and Robert E. Howard (1978)
 On Writing Science Fiction: The Editors Strike Back! (1981) with John M. Ford and George H. Scithers
 Constructing Scientifiction & Fantasy (1982) with George H. Scithers and John Ashmead
 Pathways to Elfland: The Writings of Lord Dunsany (1989)
 Lord Dunsany: A Bibliography (1993) with S. T. Joshi
 Windows of the Imagination: Essays on Fantastic Literature (1998) [includes essays on H.P. Lovecraft, M.R. James, Richard Middleton, Lord Dunsany, Dracula, Edgar Allan Poe and many reviews.
 Philcon 2003 Program Book (2003)
 The Fantastic Horizon: Essays and Reviews (2009)
 The Threshold of Forever: Essays and Reviews (2017)

As editor

Collections
 The Ghosts of the Heaviside Layer, and Other Fantasms, by Lord Dunsany (1980)
 The Ginger Cat and Other Lost Plays, by Lord Dunsany (2005)

Anthologies
 Tales from the Spaceport Bar (1987) with George H. Scithers
 Another Round at the Spaceport Bar (1989) with George H. Scithers
 The Secret History of Vampires (2007)
 Full Moon City (2010) with Martin H. Greenberg
 Cthulhu's Reign (2010)
 That is Not Dead: Tales of the Cthulhu Mythos Through the Centuries (2015)
 Tales from the Miskatonic University Library (2017)
 Mountains of Madness Revealed (2019)

Nonfiction
 Essays Lovecraftian (1976)
 Exploring Fantasy Worlds: Essays on Fantastic Literature (1985)
 Discovering Classic Fantasy Fiction (1997)
 Discovering H. P. Lovecraft (1987) (revised and expanded edition of Essays Lovecraftian)
 Discovering Classic Horror Fiction I (1992)
 Discovering Modern Horror Fiction I (1985)
 Discovering Modern Horror Fiction II (1988)
 Discovering Stephen King (1985)
 The Thomas Ligotti Reader (2003)
 The Neil Gaiman Reader (2006)
 The Robert E. Howard Reader (2010)

Interview collections
 SF Voices (1976)
 Science Fiction Voices #1: Interviews with Science Fiction Writers (1979)
 Science Fiction Voices #5: Interviews with American Science Fiction Writers of the Golden Age (1981)
 Speaking of Horror: Interviews with Writers of the Supernatural (1994)
 Speaking of Horror II: Interviews with 18 Masters of Horror! (2015)
 Speaking of the Fantastic: Interviews with Writers of Science Fiction and Fantasy (2002)
 Speaking of the Fantastic II: Interviews with Masters of Science Fiction and Fantasy (2004)
 Speaking of the Fantastic III: Interviews with Science Fiction Writers (2011)
 Speaking of the Fantastic IV (2018)

References

 
Bibliographies by writer
Bibliographies of American writers
Fantasy bibliographies
Horror fiction bibliographies
Science fiction bibliographies